Sawol Station is a station of Daegu Metro Line 2 in Sawol-dong and Sinmae-dong, Suseong District, Daegu, South Korea.

External links 
  Cyber station information from Daegu Metropolitan Transit Corporation

Daegu Metro stations
Suseong District
Railway stations opened in 2005